Platyhydnobius arizonensis is a species of beetle from a subfamily of Platyninae that can be found in North America.

External links
Platyhydnobius arizonensis on Bug Guide

Beetles described in 1892
Taxa named by George Henry Horn
Beetles of North America
Leiodidae